HMS Carlisle was a 50-gun fourth rate ship of the line of the English Royal Navy, launched at Plymouth Dockyard in 1698.

It was accidentally blown up in 1700.

Notes

References

Lavery, Brian (2003) The Ship of the Line - Volume 1: The development of the battlefleet 1650-1850. Conway Maritime Press. .

Ships of the line of the Royal Navy
1690s ships
Maritime incidents in 1700